Humewood–Cedarvale is an area of Toronto, Ontario, Canada, consisting of Humewood in the south, divided by Vaughan Road and Cedarvale Ravine. The neighbourhood is bordered by Bathurst Street on the east, Eglinton Avenue to the north, Arlington Avenue to the west, and St. Clair Avenue to the south.  Humewood has also been known as "the Woods" because of its many streets that have names ending with "-wood", including Wychwood, Humewood, Cherrywood, Valewood, Maplewood, Wellwood, Kenwood, and Pinewood. The neighbourhood's main commercial areas are along St. Clair Ave. W., referred to as Hillcrest Village and along Eglinton Ave. W..

Character 

Humewood is a lower- to upper-middle class, family-oriented neighbourhood, with a combination of single-family homes dating from the 1920s as well as a numerous mid-rise and high-rise buildings. Humewood Park, just north of St. Clair Ave. W, was once part of the estate of William Hume Blake, the namesake of the Humewood neighbourhood.  Cedarvale is a lower middle class to wealthy family-oriented community and includes modest single family homes from the 1940s as well as some multimillion-dollar homes facing the ravine that is within the Cedarvale Park and Castle Frank Brook's ravine system.

Cedarvale and Humewood are separated by Vaughan Road, and about a block further east is Cedarvale Ravine, a natural border between the two halves of the community.

Demographics
While ethnically diverse like the rest of Toronto, there is a significant Jewish community in Humewood–Cedarvale, along with several key religious sites within walking distance (Holy Blossom Temple, Beth Tzedec Synagogue, The Village Shul, Beth Sholom Congregation, Chabad of Midtown and multiple Jewish day schools). The most common mother tongue is English (about 66% in 2011), followed by Tagalog/Filipino (3.5% in 2011).

Estimates of ethnic origin by world region in Humewood–Cedarvale:
 69% European
 19% Other North American
 16% Southeast & East Asian
 5% African
 5% Central, South & Latin American
 4% Caribbean
 3% South Asian
 3% West Central Asian & Middle Eastern
 2% North American Indigenous
 <1% Oceania

The above estimates are based on the 2016 Canadian census; respondents to the census can identify with more than one ethnic origin, so the above figures can sum to more than 100%.

Estimates of Household Mean Income:
 One-person households: C$42,680
 Two-or-more person households: C$161,885

Education

Public
There are two English public education elementary schools in Humewood–Cedarvale operated by the Toronto District School Board, Humewood and Cedarvale Community Schools, which represent the namesake portions of this neighbourhood. TDSB does not operate any secondary schools in the neighbourhood, with public secondary schooling provided by nearby TDSB institutions including, Oakwood Collegiate Institute, Forest Hill Collegiate Institute, and Harbord Collegiate Institute.

In addition to the Toronto District School Board, three other public school boards also operate in the city. The Toronto Catholic District School Board (TCDSB), is a public English separate school board; Conseil scolaire Viamonde is a secular French public school board; and the Conseil scolaire de district catholique Centre-Sud is a French separate public school board. However, none of the three school boards operate a school in the neighbourhood.

Additionally, there are no public libraries in this neighbourhood, but one may use the Oakwood Village, Maria Shchuka, Wychwood, St. Clair-Dufferin or Forest Hill public libraries.

Private
Two private elementary institutions are based in the neighbourhood, The Leo Baeck Day School, a private, Reform Jewish day school and Robbins Hebrew Academy, a private Conservative Jewish day school are also located in this community.

Transportation

Public transportation accessible by two subway stations: Eglinton West (to be renamed Cedarvale station when Line 5 Eglinton opens in 2023 and makes it an interchange station) and St. Clair West, as well as the St. Clair West 512 Streetcar and the 90 Vaughan bus route.

Nearby Neighbourhoods
 Oakwood Village

References

External links
Demographic profile at Toronto.ca
National Post article on Toronto's Humewood–Cedarvale neighbourhood
City of Toronto - Humewood–Cedarvale Neighbourhood Profile

Neighbourhoods in Toronto
Jewish communities in Canada